Rockdale is a village in Will County, Illinois, United States which had a population of 1,976 during the 2010 census.

Geography
Rockdale is located at  (41.507480, -88.115233).

Rockdale was founded in 1894 by a group of local businessmen.

Demographics

As of the census of 2000, there were 1,888 people, 762 households, and 473 families residing in the village. The racial makeup of the village was 82.89% White, 0.85% African American, 0.48% Native American, 0.37% Asian, 10.86% from other races, and 4.56% from two or more races. Hispanic or Latino of any race were 21.98% of the population.

There were 762 households, out of which 30.2% had children under the age of 18 living with them, 45.0% were married couples living together, 10.8% had a female householder with no husband present, and 37.8% were non-families. 31.1% of all households were made up of individuals, and 11.4% had someone living alone who was 65 years of age or older. The average household size was 2.47 and the average family size was 3.11.

The median income for a household in the village was $39,954, and the median income for a family was $47,232. Males had a median income of $35,761 versus $24,375 for females. The per capita income for the village was $18,738. About 7.7% of families and 9.3% of the population were below the poverty line, including 13.1% of those under age 18 and 4.5% of those age 65 or over.

Emergency service
The village's fire suppression services are operated by the Rockdale Fire Protection district. EMS is provided by Daley's Ambulance, and law enforcement by Rockdale Police.

References

External links
Rockdale official website

Villages in Will County, Illinois
Villages in Illinois